Counting to Zero is the eighth studio album by Collide, released on September 27, 2011 by Noiseplus Music.

Reception
I Die:You Die described Counting to Zero as "a natural evolution away from their noisier days" and "Collide’s music has always been "deep", however one wants to take that term (the trip-hop elements of their sound, for example, are still in full effect), and it’s encouraging to see them finding new ways to stay true to and explore the particular combination of mystique and virtuosity which has made them such an endearing and enduring force for all these years." ReGen praised called the album "quintessential", awarded the album three and a half out of five and said it "may not be a stretch for them, but is full of the same rich production and performance we’ve come to expect and love."

Track listing

Personnel
Adapted from the Counting to Zero liner notes.

Collide
 Eric Anest (as Statik) – keyboards, sequencer, cover art, illustrations, design, electric guitar (2-4, 6, 9-11), effects (6)
 Karin Johnston (as kaRIN) – vocals, cover art, illustrations, design

Additional performers
 Dean Garcia – electric guitar (9)
 Kevin Kipnis – bass guitar (11)
 Kai Kurosawa – bass guitar (1-6, 10)
 Scott Landes – electric guitar (1, 2, 4-6, 9-11), acoustic guitar (5, 6)

Production and design
 Chris Bellman – mastering
 Dave Keffer – photography

Release history

References

External links 
 Counting to Zero at collide.net
 
 Counting to Zero at Bandcamp
 Counting to Zero at iTunes

Collide (band) albums
2011 albums